Christina "Tina" Neal is a volcanologist  and an honoree for the Samuel J. Heyman Service to America Medals. Neal was the Scientist in Charge at the USGS Hawaiian Volcano Observatory from 2015 to 2021. Neal took over as the director of the U.S. Geological Survey Volcano Science Center on May 9, 2021.

Education 
Neal is a native of Connecticut and graduated from Brown University in 1980 with a bachelor's degree in geological sciences. In 1986, she received a master's degree in geology from Arizona State University.

Career 
From 1983-1989, Neal worked for the United States Geological Survey at the Hawaiian Volcano Observatory. In 1990, she joined the newly established Alaska Volcano Observatory in Anchorage, Alaska, where she monitored eruptions in the Aleutian arc and investigated of the eruption history and volcanic hazards along the Alaska Peninsula and the eastern Aleutians. In 1998, Neal took a two-year posting at the United States Agency of International Development in Washington, D.C., as the first USGS geoscience advisor to the Office of U.S. Foreign Disaster Assistance, where she assisted with and reviewed hazard mitigation programs for several countries, including Thailand, Nepal, Ecuador, Colombia, and Kazakhstan, among others. She returned in 2000 to the Alaska Volcano Observatory as a staff geologist, mapping and studying active Alaskan volcanoes. In March 2015, she became the scientist in charge at the USGS Hawaiian Volcano Observatory. 

In 2019, Neal and the USGS Hawaiian Volcano Observatory Team was a Science and Environment finalist for the Samuel J. Heyman Service to America Medal.

Neal became the director of the U.S. Geological Survey Volcano Science Center on May 9, 2021. Among her other duties, she manages the National Volcano Early Warning System.

References

External links 
 Interview with Neal from Oregon State's Volcano World 
 USGS profile 

Volcanologists
United States Geological Survey personnel
Living people
Year of birth missing (living people)